Banaruiyeh (also Romanized as Banārū’īyeh, Banarooyeh, Banārū”īyeh, Banārūyeh, and Bonārūyeh; formerly, Fathābād) is a city and capital of Banaruiyeh District, in Larestan County, Fars Province, Iran.  At the 2006 census, its population was 9,318, in 1,943 families.

References

Populated places in Larestan County

Cities in Fars Province